Nigata or Niigata Station may refer to:
Nigata Station (仁方駅), in Kure, Hiroshima Prefecture, Japan
Niigata Station (新潟駅), in Niigata, Niigata Prefecture, Japan

See also
Nigatake Station (苦竹駅), in Sendai, Miyagi Prefecture, Japan
Niigata-daigaku-mae Station (新潟大学前駅), in Niigata, Niigata Prefecture, Japan
Niigata Kamotsu Terminal Station (新潟貨物ターミナル駅), in Niigata, Niigata Prefecture, Japan